Kladorub is a village in northwestern Bulgaria.
It is located in Vidin region, Dimovo Municipality.

Geography 
Archar river floats near the village.

History 
Kladorub lies upon the remains of an ancient village. The name of that village - Conbustica, is marked on the Roman road map Tabula Peutengiriana as a point, located on the road from Ratiaria (current Archar) to Naisos (current Niš). 

Thare also lies the remains of an ancient Roman war camp. There, in the first years of the Roman occupation, a stone fortification had been built.

Many Roman ceramics and metal objects have been found in excavations near the village.

Cultural and Natural sights 
The Magura cave is located 6 kilometers west of the village. 

The Belogradchik rocks are located 18 kilometers from Kladorub.

Honour

Kladorub Glacier on Nordenskjöld Coast in Graham Land, Antarctica is named after the village.

Villages in Vidin Province